Charles Phelps may refer to:

Charles Phelps Taft (1843-1929), American lawyer and politician
Charles Phelps Taft II (1897-1983), Republican mayor of Cincinnati, Ohio
Charles Phelps Norton (1858-1920), chancellor of the University of Buffalo (1909-1920)

See also
Charles Phelps (disambiguation)